Büşra Akbaş (born 8 March 1995) is a Turkish female basketball player. The  national plays Point guard.

Club career
On 28 February 2023, she signed with Galatasaray of the Turkish Women's Basketball Super League (TKBL).

References

External links
 BÜŞRA AKBAŞ at TBF.org.tr

1995 births
Living people
Turkish women's basketball players
Point guards
Basketball players from Istanbul
Botaş SK players
Hatay Büyükşehir Belediyesi (women's basketball) players
Galatasaray S.K. (women's basketball) players